Wolf Riders is a 1935 American Western film directed by Harry S. Webb and starring Jack Perrin, Lillian Gilmore and Lafe McKee.

Main cast
 Jack Perrin as Jack Jennings  
 Lillian Gilmore as Mary Clark  
 Lafe McKee as John Clark - Indian Agent  
 Nancy Deshon as Peggy Packard  
 William Gould as Butch Weldon  
 George Chesebro as Al Pierce  
 Earl Dwire as Red Wolf

References

Bibliography
 Pitts, Michael R. Poverty Row Studios, 1929–1940: An Illustrated History of 55 Independent Film Companies, with a Filmography for Each. McFarland & Company, 2005.

External links
 

1935 films
1935 Western (genre) films
1930s English-language films
American Western (genre) films
Films directed by Harry S. Webb
Reliable Pictures films
American black-and-white films
1930s American films